Yrjö William Kanerva (26 November 1902 – 10 October 1956) was a Finnish international footballer who earned 51 caps at international level between 1922 and 1938, scoring 13 goals. Kanerva played club football for HJK and HPS, and he competed at the 1936 Summer Olympics. In Mestaruussarja he played 113 matches and scored 33 times for HPS. In total he scored 55 goals for them, rest of the goals coming in cup-formatted Finnish championship tournaments. For HJK he scored 11 goals in 3 tournaments.

References

External links
 

1902 births
1956 deaths
People from Pitkyarantsky District
Finnish footballers
Finland international footballers
Helsingin Jalkapalloklubi players
Olympic footballers of Finland
Footballers at the 1936 Summer Olympics
Association football midfielders
Footballers from Helsinki